Matthew Joseph McMahon (born April 26, 1978) is the current men's college basketball head coach for LSU. McMahon was formerly the men’s basketball coach at Murray State. In his third year leading the program, McMahon led the Racers to a 26–6 record that included Ohio Valley Conference regular-season and tournament championships.

A 6-foot-1 shooting guard, McMahon was a regular player under head coach Buzz Peterson at Appalachian State from 1996 to 2000. The Mountaineers posted a 65–25 record over his last three years, finishing with an NCAA Tournament appearance in 2000. During those years, McMahon averaged 6.9 points in 90 games, hitting 37.5 percent (124 of 331) of his 3-point attempts. He graduated in 2000 with a degree in marketing.

Coaching career

Appalachian State 
After his playing career, McMahon stayed on at Appalachian State as a student assistant men's basketball coach under head coach Houston Fancher in 2000–01. He rejoined Peterson for a season as a graduate assistant coach at Tennessee before returning to Appalachian State in 2002 as a full-time assistant under Fancher. In 2010, he again joined Peterson, this time as an assistant at UNC-Wilmington before joining Steve Prohm's staff at Murray State as assistant coach in 2011.

Murray State 
At Murray State under Prohm, he helped guide the Racers to 104 victories in four years, including appearances in the 2012 NCAA tournament, the 2015 National Invitation Tournament, and the 2014 CollegeInsider.com Postseason Tournament, where the Racers won the tournament championship.

In 2012, FoxSports.com and CollegeInsider.com ranked McMahon as one of college basketball's best assistant coaches, while in 2015 he was tabbed as one of "9 Under-the-Radar Coaches to Watch" by NCAA.com.

McMahon was hired as an assistant to Eric Konkol at Louisiana Tech on May 27, 2015. On June 10, 2015, McMahon was hired as head coach of Murray State. He replaced Prohm, who left to take the head coach position at Iowa State University.

"I am so excited to know that Coach McMahon will be returning to Murray State to lead the Racers," Murray State athletic director Allen Ward said. "After watching him for four years, I'm convinced he's the right man for the job. He's an outstanding coach, nationally recognized as one of the top assistants in the country, with a tremendous upside. Matt has the talent and integrity to continue the momentum we've built, put his own stamp on the program, and meet the expectations that come with being the head coach at Murray State."

McMahon's third Racer team posted a 26–6 record, winning Ohio Valley Conference regular-season and tournament championships. They were awarded a 12 seed in the 2018 NCAA tournament, where they fell in the first round to West Virginia, 85–68. After the season, he was named National Association of Basketball Coaches District 19 Coach of the Year.

In his fourth year with the Racers he led future No. 2 NBA Draft pick Ja Morant and his teammates to their second straight OVC title, after sharing the regular season title with Belmont. The team upset Markus Howard and Marquette in the Round of 64, before falling to Florida State in the NCAA Tournament. The team would finish the season with a 28-5 overall record, while going 16-2 in conference play.

On April 5, 2019, McMahon was awarded a four-year contract extension which would have kept him at Murray State through the 2022–23 season had he not accepted a job at Louisiana State University in March 2022. McMahon's salary was increased from $300,000 a year to $500,000 a year.

Following the close of the 2021–22 season, McMahon was named the OVC Coach of the Year. This was after McMahon guided the Racers to a 31-3 overall record, including going undefeated in the OVC at 18-0, winning both the OVC regular season and tournament championships, and reaching the NCAA Tournament Round of 32.

LSU 
On March 21, 2022, McMahon was announced as the new men's basketball head coach at Louisiana State University, agreeing to a 7 year deal.

Head coaching record

References

1978 births
Living people
American men's basketball coaches
American men's basketball players
Appalachian State Mountaineers men's basketball players
Basketball coaches from Tennessee
Basketball players from Tennessee
College men's basketball head coaches in the United States
Murray State Racers men's basketball coaches
LSU Tigers basketball coaches
Shooting guards
UNC Wilmington Seahawks men's basketball coaches